Cetoscarus is a genus of parrotfish native to the Indo-Pacific.

Species
 Cetoscarus bicolor (Rüppell, 1829)
 Cetoscarus ocellatus (Valenciennes, 1840)

References

 
Taxa named by J. L. B. Smith
Marine fish genera
Perciformes genera